Carl Augustus Hansberry (April 30, 1895 – March 17, 1946) was an American real estate broker and political activist, and was plaintiff in the 1940 Supreme Court decision Hansberry v. Lee. He was also the father of award-winning playwright Lorraine Hansberry and the great-grandfather of actress Taye Hansberry.

Life and career
Carl Augustus Hansberry was born on April 30, 1895 in Gloster, Amite County, Mississippi. He was a son of Elden Hayes and Pauline (Bailey) Hansberry. He and his older brother, William Leo Hansberry, were raised by their stepfather, Elijah Washington. As a young man, he moved to Chicago, as part of the Great Migration.

He married Nannie Louise Perry of Columbia, Tennessee, the daughter of George Perry, a minister, and his wife, Charlotte "Lottie" Organ. Together Carl and Nannie had four children:

Carl Augustus Hansberry, Jr. (February 19, 1920 – January 12, 1997)
Perry Holloway Hansberry (June 4, 1921 – December 18, 2002)
Mamie Louise Hansberry (born April 2, 1923), former wife of journalist Vincent Tubbs and grandmother of actress Taye Hansberry
Lorraine Vivian Hansberry (May 19, 1930 – January 12, 1965)

When his youngest child was eight, Hansberry bought a house in the Washington Park Subdivision of Chicago that was restricted to whites.  The family was met with intense hostility by local residents. The Kenwood Improvement Association filed a mandatory injunction for the Hansberry family to vacate their home which was granted by a Circuit Court judge and upheld on appeal by the Illinois Supreme Court.  Hansberry challenged the ruling, which led to the landmark U. S. Supreme Court case Hansberry v. Lee (1940). In a unanimous opinion rendered November 12, 1940, the court rejected the specific restrictive covenant impacting the Hansberry family without ruling on the constitutionality of restrictive residential covenants in general.

In 1940, Hansberry made an unsuccessful bid for Congress. In the wake of that loss and frustrated by the pervasive racism in the United States, he made plans to move his family to Mexico. While visiting Mexico, Hansberry suffered a cerebral hemorrhage and died there on March 17, 1946. He is buried at the Burr Oak Cemetery in Cook County, Illinois.

The family's experience with racial segregation would serve as the inspiration for his daughter Lorraine Hansberry's award-winning play, A Raisin in the Sun.

References

1895 births
1946 deaths
People from Gloster, Mississippi
American activists
People from Chicago
People from Cook County, Illinois
Burials at Burr Oak Cemetery